Loudspeaker is a 2009 Indian Malayalam-language comedy-thriller film produced, written, and directed by Jayaraj, starring Mammootty, Sasi Kumar, Gracy Singh, Jagathy Sreekumar, Cochin Hanifa, Saleem Kumar, and KPAC Lalitha.

Plot
The movie is all about the relationships between two rare bred men from extremely different strata of society, but more in common than is apparent from the first look. They might have never run into each other, with their stark contrast in nature and life styles and would have hardly given each other a second look, if they hadn't met in these defined circumstances. But the movie throws them together, intertwined in worst of their days and progressively built in the rapport between the extremes, and infuses the spirit of worthy and meaningful life to all in the screen and those who  watches them on screen.

Mike Philippose, a barefooted uneducated simpleton (from Thopramkudy),who lands in the city, armoured with his loud voice, opinions and dazzling wit to stand up with the different level of etiquettes he finds in the flats of the city. His arrival is as a kidney donor to ailing Anand Menon, an astrophysicist who returned to India after working in the United States for the last forty six years. A dejected man who wants to run away from his memories, Menon is turned into the reverse track by Mike, who lives with his memories and snobs about his deceased father and about the silent hamlet of Thopramkudy. 
                 
The movie packs a lot of characters like the old man in legal tussle with his children, the fighting couple who even don't like to see face to face, a secretary of the flat residents who only has a dog for his company, a group of loud bachelors and a kid who turns into a brat, left alone and away from her parents.

Cast

Soundtrack
The songs of Loudspeaker were composed by Bijibal and lyrics were written by Anil Panachooran. "Alliyambal", a famous song from Rosy composed by Job Master and sung by K. J. Yesudas, is adopted in this film. The new version of the song is sung by his son, Vijay Yesudas.

"Changazhi Muthumayi" - Sung by Ganesh Sundaram
"Kattarinu Thorathoru"- Jayachandran. Composer: Bijibal Manayil Lyrics: Anil Panachooran 
Singer: P.Jayachandran
"Manjinte Mamala"
"Alliyambal" - Sung by Vijay Yesudas
"Kattarinu Thorathoru - Anjali Muraleedharan (Female)"
"Changazhi Muthumayi (Male)"

References

External links 
 
 

2009 films
2000s Malayalam-language films
Films shot in Thrissur
Films shot in Munnar
Films directed by Jayaraj